Eric Scara Bamuza Sono (born 21 March 1980) is a South African former professional footballer who played as a midfielder.

Career
Born in Johannesburg, Sono spent his entire professional career with Jomo Cosmos. He also earned 4 international caps for the South Africa national team in 2007.

Personal life
His grandfather Eric Bhamuza Sono and father Jomo Sono were also footballers. In March 2019 it was reported that his house was at risk of repossession due to non-payment of mortgage payments, and in February 2021 it was reported that he was in arrears to the City of Johannesburg Council. In May 2020 he was accused by Sherwyn Naicker of "ruining his reputation" whilst Naicker played at Jomo Cosmos.

References

1980 births
Living people
Soccer players from Johannesburg
South African soccer players
South Africa international soccer players
Jomo Cosmos F.C. players
South African Premier Division players
National First Division players
Association football midfielders